Johanna Jacoba van Beaumont (c. 1752, Sluis17 October 1827, Bergen op Zoom), was a politically active Dutch journalist, feminist and editor. 

She belonged to the radical democrats who were active in the radical paper Nationaale Bataafsche Courant after the Batavian Revolution of 1795. In 1797, she organised a list of names which she delivered to the national parliament in support of a radically democratic constitution wherein she suggested women should be willing to fight to the death for a democratically centralized system. She signed with the name "Catharina" which led to her colleague Catharina Heybeek being arrested in 1798 for incitement in the place of Johanna.

References
historici.nl

1752 births
1827 deaths
Dutch journalists
Dutch feminists
18th-century Dutch women writers
18th-century Dutch writers
18th-century journalists
People from Sluis
18th-century women journalists